Eat the rich is a slogan used in opposition to the wealthy class which has been used in various times.

Music
 "Eat the Rich", a 1978 song by British Lions from the self-titled album
 "Eat the Rich", a 1983 song by Krokus from the album Headhunter
 "Eat the Rich", a 1986 song by Tysondog from the album Crimes of Insanity
 "Eat the Rich" (Motörhead song), a 1987 song composed for the Peter Richardson film of the same name
 "Eat the Rich" (Aerosmith song), a 1993 song
 "Eating the Rich” a 1994 song by The Lowest of the Low from the album Hallucigenia
 "Eat the Rich", a 2000 song by Fozzy from the self-titled album
 Eat the Rich, a 2014 album by State of Mind
 "Eat Rich", a 2014 song by Busdriver, from the album Perfect Hair

Other uses
 Eat the Rich (film), a 1987 film directed by Peter Richardson
 Eat the Rich (book), a 1998 book by P. J. O'Rourke
 The Eat the Rich Gang, a political group involved in Fifth Estate, a radical journal produced in Detroit